Ushinka is a rural locality (a selo) in Lopukhovskoye Rural Settlement, Rudnyansky District, Volgograd Oblast, Russia. The population was 112 as of 2010.

Geography 
Ushinka is located 27 km southwest of Rudnya (the district's administrative centre) by road. Lopukhovka is the nearest rural locality.

References 

Rural localities in Rudnyansky District, Volgograd Oblast